Northrup Hill School District 10 is a historic one-room school building located at Rathbone in Steuben County, New York. It was built about 1850 and is a vernacular Greek Revival style, one story, rectangular, gable roofed frame structure.

It was listed on the National Register of Historic Places in 1999.  It is now used as a museum by the Middletown Historical Society.

References

One-room schoolhouses in New York (state)
Schoolhouses in the United States
School buildings on the National Register of Historic Places in New York (state)
Buildings and structures in Steuben County, New York
National Register of Historic Places in Steuben County, New York